The 2021 season was Southern Brave's first season of the new franchise 100 ball cricket, The Hundred. As a franchise, Southern Brave were the most successful in the 2021 season with both the men's and women's teams playing in the finals. The women's team eventually finished as runners-up while the men's team won their competition.

Players

Men's side 
 Bold denotes players with international caps.

Women's side 
 Bold denotes players with international caps.

Regular season

Fixtures (Men)

July

August

Fixtures (Women)

July

August

Standings

Men

 advances to the Final
 advances to the Eliminator

Women

 advances to the Final
 advances to the Eliminator

Knockout stages

Men

Eliminator

Final

Women

Final

References

Cricket clubs established in 2019
2019 establishments in England
The Hundred (cricket)